The Canton du Parcq is a former canton situated in the Pas-de-Calais département and in the Nord-Pas-de-Calais region of France. It was disbanded following the French canton reorganisation which came into effect in March 2015. It consisted of 24 communes, which joined the canton of Auxi-le-Château in 2015. It had a total of 7,658 inhabitants (2012).

Geography 
This canton is centred on the village of Le Parcq in the arrondissement of Montreuil. The altitude varies from 25 m at (Grigny) to 142 m at (Azincourt) for an average of 72 m.

The canton comprised 24 communes:

Auchy-lès-Hesdin
Azincourt
Béalencourt
Blangy-sur-Ternoise
Blingel
Éclimeux
Fillièvres
Fresnoy
Galametz
Grigny
Incourt
Maisoncelle
Neulette
Noyelles-lès-Humières
Le Parcq
Le Quesnoy-en-Artois
Rollancourt
Saint-Georges
Tramecourt
Vacqueriette-Erquières
Vieil-Hesdin
Wail
Wamin
Willeman

Population

See also
 Arrondissement of Montreuil
 Cantons of Pas-de-Calais
 Communes of Pas-de-Calais

References

Former cantons of Pas-de-Calais
2015 disestablishments in France
States and territories disestablished in 2015